The 302nd Infantry Division (German: 302. Infanteriedivision), initially formed as the 302nd Static Infantry Division, was a German Army infantry division in World War II.

History 
The division was raised in November 1940 from men in Military District II as the 302nd Static Infantry Division and was initially used as a French-occupying force, with some elements remaining in Germany. According to Hauptmann Joachim Lindner: 'Day after day nothing.'

Dieppe raid
An Allied amphibious raid, to determine if a large landing could be attempted, was made at Dieppe, France on 19 August 1942. The Allies suffered heavy losses with men and tanks strewn over the beach along with landing craft. The operation painted a grim picture for any future Allied incursion. A German major observed, 'I have not witnessed images more terrible. In one landing craft the entire crew of about forty men had been wiped out by a direct hit. On the water we could see bits of wrecks, ships in ruins, corpses floating and soldiers wrestling with death. In Paris there was jubilation. The enemy's operation was smashed in just over nine hours!'

Over 6,000 troops landed at Dieppe (mainly Canadians) and less than 2,500 of them succeeded in returning to Britain afterwards. The Germans suffered a coastal battery damaged, 48 Luftwaffe planes destroyed, and approximately 600 casualties.

This first combat led to the division being nicknamed the "Dieppe division". In October 1942 the division was reorganized as the 302nd Infantry Division (with improved mobility and offensive capabilities), and after a few additional months serving as a reserve in France and was transferred to the Eastern Front in early 1943 to help shore up the line after the German defeat in the Battle of Stalingrad.

Actions in the Eastern front
In January 1943, the division was sent to the Eastern Front to aid in the Kharkov offensive, where it fought in Luhansk (then known as Voroshilovgrad). Between April and September the division switched to defensive tactics along the Mius-Front. It defended the Ukrainian city of Zaporizhia between October and December before withdrawing to the Nikopol bridgehead, where General Rüdiger was wounded-in-action. The division retreated west to the Dnieper in April. Rüdiger's replacement, General von Bogen, was captured by Soviet troops during May 1944 in Bessarabia. Colonel Fischer, the 302nd Artillery Regiment's commander, took his place. The division met its end on 25 August 1944 when the Soviets succeeded in encircling it during its withdrawal from the Dniester. During the encirclement Fischer was wounded and soon after captured.

Aftermath
Decimated during the Dnieper–Carpathian Offensive, the division was disbanded and those few survivors were transferred to the 15th and 75th Infantry Divisions.

Elements

1940
570th Infantry Regiment
571st Infantry Regiment
572nd Infantry Regiment
302nd Artillery Regiment
302nd Anti-tank Battalion
302nd Reconnaissance Battalion
302nd Engineer Battalion
302nd Supply Battalion
302nd Divisional Supply detachment

1943
570th Infantry Regiment
571st Infantry Regiment
572nd Infantry Regiment
302nd Artillery Regiment
302nd Mobile Battalion
302nd Bicycle unit
302nd Engineer Battalion
302nd Intelligence Department
302nd Infantry Division supply troops
302nd Medical Company
302nd Ambulance Train

1944
570th Grenadier Regiment
572nd Grenadier Regiment
Division Group 125
Regiment Group 420
Regiment Group 421
302nd Divisional fusilier battalion
302nd Artillery Regiment
302nd Mobile Battalion
302nd Engineer Battalion
302nd Field Replacement Battalion
302nd Intelligence Department
302nd Infantry Division Supply Troops
302nd Medical Company
302nd Ambulance train

See also 
 Dieppe Raid
 Operation Jubilee order of battle
 Division (military)
 Military unit
 List of German divisions in World War II
 Heer
 Wehrmacht

References

Bibliography
 "302. Infanterie-Division". German language article. Retrieved April 9, 2005.
 Hargreaves, Richard (2006). “The Germans in Normandy”, Pen and Sword, .

Military units and formations established in 1940
Military units and formations disestablished in 1945
Infantry divisions of Germany during World War II